The 2018 BBL Playoffs was the concluding postseason of the 2017–18 Basketball Bundesliga season. The Playoffs started on 5 May and ended on 16 June 2018.

Bracket

Quarterfinals
The quarterfinals were played in a best of five format from 5 to 19 May 2018.

Bayern Munich vs Fraport Skyliners

Alba Berlin vs EWE Baskets Oldenburg

Riesen Ludwigsburg vs Medi Bayreuth

Brose Bamberg vs Telekom Baskets Bonn

Semifinals
The semifinals were played in a best of five format from 20 to 31 May 2018.

Bayern Munich vs Brose Bamberg

Alba Berlin vs Riesen Ludwigsburg

Finals
The finals were played in a best of five format from 3 to 16 June 2018.

References

External links
Official website 

BBL Playoffs
2017–18 in German basketball leagues